Mohammed IV may refer to:
Mehmed IV Giray (1610–1674), khan of the Crimean Khanate
Mehmed IV (1642–1693), Ottoman sultan
Mohammed IV of Morocco (1802–1873), sultan
Muhammad IV al-Hadi (1855–1906), ruler of Tunisia

See also
Muhammad Imaaduddeen IV (died 1882), sultan of the Maldives